Masca is a monotypic moth genus in the family Erebidae. Its only species, Masca abactalis, is found in Myanmar and from Sundaland to New Guinea. Both the genus and the species were first described by Francis Walker in 1858.

References

Pangraptinae
Noctuoidea genera
Monotypic moth genera